Walter Joseph Tragesser (June 14, 1887 – October 2, 1970) was a professional baseball player.  He was a catcher over parts of seven seasons (1913, 1915–1920) with the Boston Braves and Philadelphia Phillies.  For his career, he compiled a .215 batting average, with six home runs and 66 runs batted in.

An alumnus of Purdue University, where he played college baseball for the Boilermakers from 1908–1909, he was born and later died in Lafayette, Indiana at the age of 83.

References

External links

1887 births
1970 deaths
Boston Braves players
Philadelphia Phillies players
Major League Baseball catchers
Baseball players from Indiana
Zanesville Potters players
Birmingham Barons players
Jersey City Skeeters players
Buffalo Bisons (minor league) players
Reading Aces players
Purdue Boilermakers baseball players
Zanesville Flood Sufferers players